Delfín Lévano (November 4, 1885 – September 23, 1941) was a Peruvian anarchist, journalist, poet, musician and lecturer. Founder of the newspaper La Protesta of Peru in its first phase (1911–'26) and El Proletariado of anarchist and anarchosyndicalist groups.

Son of the anarchist Manuel Caracciolo Lévano and father of César Lévano, a popular journalist and professor at the National University of San Marcos.

Literature 
Luis Tejada Ripalda / César Lévano: La utopía libertaria en el Perú. Manuel y Delfín Lévano. Obra Completa, Fondo Editorial del Congreso del Peru, Lima 2006,

External links 

 'Anarcho-syndicalism in Peru, 1905–1930', by Steven Hirsch (LibCom.org)
 Delfin Levano (Marxists.org) (Spanish)
 'Quien era Delfin Levano?' (Diario UNO) (Spanish)

Peruvian anarchists
Peruvian journalists
Male journalists
Peruvian male writers
Anarcho-syndicalists
1885 births
1941 deaths
20th-century Peruvian writers
20th-century male writers
20th-century journalists